Charles Farmer Duvall (November 18, 1935 - October 8, 2020) was bishop of the Episcopal Diocese of the Central Gulf Coast from 1981 to 2001. He was consecrated on April 11, 1981.

Early life and education
Duvall was born on November 18, 1935, in Cheraw, South Carolina, the son of Henry Duvall and Elizabeth Phoebe Farmer. He graduated with a Bachelor of Arts in History from The Citadel, The Military College of South Carolina in 1957. He married Nancy Warren Rice on June 2, 1957, and together had three children. He then studied at the Virginia Theological Seminary and graduated with a Master of Divinity in 1960. He was awarded an honorary Doctor of Divinity from Virginia Theological Seminary in 1982 and from Sewanee: The University of the South in 1986.

Ordained Ministry
Duvall was ordained deacon in 1960 and priest in 1961. From 1960 to 1962, he served three small missions in South Carolina, notably Holy Trinity in Grahamville, South Carolina and the Church of the Cross in Bluffton, South Carolina. In 1962 he became rector of St. James' Church in James Island, South Carolina. Between 1970 and 1977, he served as rector of Holy Trinity Church in Fayetteville, North Carolina, after which he became rector of the Church of the Advent in Spartanburg, South Carolina.

Bishop
On November 15, 1980, in St Paul's Church, Mobile, Alabama, Duvall was elected as the second Bishop of the Gulf Coast. He was consecrated on April 11, 1981, by Presiding Bishop John Allin in the Field House of the University of West Florida in Pensacola, Florida. During the latter part of his episcopacy, several churches (and numerous other individuals) in the diocese voted to leave the Episcopal Church which created disruption in the diocese. He retired in 2001.

Death
The Rt. Rev. Charles Farmer Duvall, retired bishop of the Episcopal Diocese of the Central Gulf Coast, died on October 8, 2020, in Columbia, SC. Due to Coronavirus restrictions regarding inside services, a burial service was held at graveside at Old St. David's Episcopal Church in Cheraw, South Carolina on Tuesday October 13, 2020 at 11:00 am.

References 

Episcopal Clerical Directory 2015

1935 births
Living people
Episcopal bishops of the Central Gulf Coast
People from Cheraw, South Carolina
The Citadel, The Military College of South Carolina alumni
Virginia Theological Seminary alumni